Zavyalovsky District is the name of several administrative and municipal districts in Russia:
Zavyalovsky District, Altai Krai, an administrative and municipal district of Altai Krai
Zavyalovsky District, Udmurt Republic, an administrative and municipal district of the Udmurt Republic

References